The Battle of Irtysh River or Battle of Yexi River was a battle in 657 between Tang Dynasty general Su Dingfang and the Western Turkic Khaganate qaghan Ashina Helu during the Tang campaign against the Western Turks. It was fought along the Irtysh River near the Altai Mountains. Su Dingfang deployed his infantry in the south, and cavalry in the north behind a hill. Helu's forces, consisting of 100,000 cavalry, surrounded and charged at the Chinese infantry 3 times, all of the charges were repelled. Then Helu's forces were ambushed by the Tang cavalry from the north. Helu was defeated during Su's surprise attack, and lost most of his soldiers. Turkic tribes loyal to Helu surrendered, and the retreating Helu was captured the next day.

Helu's defeat ended the Western Turkic Khaganate, strengthened Tang control of Xinjiang, and led to Tang suzerainty over the western Turks.

References

Irtysh River
657
Irtysh River
Military history of the Göktürks
Chinese Central Asia
History of Kazakhstan
7th century in China
Western Turkic Khaganate